Benoît Alhoste was a French painter of the 17th century. Likely born in Marsonnas around 1620, he died in Bourg-en-Bresse in 1677. The musée de Brou in Bourg-en-Bresse contains four of his paintings, taken from that city's Convent of the Visitation.

References
catalogue of the exhibition Peinture religieuse en Bresse au XVIIe siècle, musée de Brou, 1984

1620s births
1677 deaths
People from Marsonnas
French male painters
17th-century French painters